Clara Miller Burd (17 May 1873 – 11 November 1933) was an American stained glass designer and children's book and magazine cover illustrator.

Early life
Burd was born on 17 May 1873 in New York City, United States of America to Charles Edgar Burd and Amelia Roe Burd of Patchogue, New York. She was educated at Chase School and the National Academy of Design in New York. In 1898, she traveled to Paris, France to continue her art education where she became a student of Gustave-Claude-Etienne Courtois at the Académie Colarossi.

Career
After returning from France, Burd worked as a stained glass designer at the Tiffany Glass and Decorating Company in New York. She also worked at the J&R Lamb Studios as well as at the Church Glass and Decorating Company.

Notable designs include :
 St. Andrew's Episcopal Church, Highland Park, Pittsburgh. The East and West transept windows. (Completed while employed with the Church Glass and Decorating Company)
 First Church of Christ, Pittsfield, Massachusetts. The memorial window to Dr. William Davis titled Angels of Life and Death (Independent design.)
 West End Collegiate Church, New York City, New York. The East transept window to the memory of Anna Van Nostrand titled Morning cometh and the shadows flee away - a 16 foot high full length image of Christ standing to the side with his hand raised to the rising sun with two kneeling angels at the base of the window on either side.(Independent design.)
 Woodlawn Cemetery, New York. Mausoleum of William Bradley. Window titled Memory
 Forest Hill Cemetery, Utica, New York. Mausoleum of James S. Sherman. Vice-President. Memorial window of Easter lilies with a background of antique ruby glass.
 Lakeview Cemetery, Cleveland, Ohio. Memorial window of river flowing through a lily bed, with a background of pink sky and a descending dove.
 Trinity Episcopal Church, Roslyn, Long Island, New York. Windows presented by Mr Clarence H. Mackay. (Made by Church Glass and Decorating Company.)
 St Paul's Episcopal Church in Englewood, NJ ("The Last Supper" reredos, signed) 
 Plymouth Congregational Church, Milwaukee, Wisconsin. Seventh memorial window, largest in the church; depicts an angel.

 
In addition to working with the stained glass art firms Burd also designed independently. She registered the copyright in some of her stained glass designs and her illustrations

As well as her stained glass window design work, Burd also illustrated of children's books and magazine covers. She signed her work C M Burd or CMB.

Illustrations
The books and magazines she illustrated include:
 Tennyson, Alfred. In Memoriam. Surgis & Walton Co., New York, 1909
 Stall, Sylvanus. With the children on Sundays, through eye-gate, and ear-gate into the city of child-soul. The Uplift Publishing Company, Philadelphia, 1911
 Olcott, Frances Jenkins. Good Stories for Great Holidays Houghton Mifflin Company, 1914
 Marks, Jeannette. The Children in the Wood Stories. Milton Bradley, Springfield, 1919
 Bailey, Carolyn Sherwood. Stories of great adventures (adapted from the classics), Milton Bradley, Springfield, 1919
 Cover illustration for Modern Priscilla August 1922
 Spyri, Johanna. Heidi. The John C. Winston Company, Philadelphia, 1924
 Dodge, Mary Mapes. Hans Brinker or the Silver Skates The John C. Winston Company, Philadelphia, 1925
 Alcott, Louisa May. Jo's Boys. Little, Brown & Co., 1925
 Lawrence, Josephine. Next door neighbors. Cupples & Leon, New York, 1926
 Yonge, Charlotte M. A Book of Golden Deeds. Macmillan Co., 1927
 Alcott, Louisa May. An Old Fashioned Girl. The John C. Winston Company, Philadelphia, 1928
 Alcott, Louisa May. Little men: Life at Plumfield with Jo's boys. The John C. Winston Company, Philadelphia, 1928
 Edgeworth, Maria. Simple Susan and Other Tales. Macmillan Co., New York, 1929
 Dickens, Charles. Dickens' stories about children, retold and with an introduction by Elizabeth Lodor Merchant. The John C. Winston Company, Philadelphia, circa 1929

Paul McCartney used two illustrations for his 1972 Single Mary Had A Little Lamb for the front and rear cover and the labels.

Exhibitions and recognition
Her work has been exhibited at the National Academy of Design in 1900, the annual exhibition of the American Water Color Society, New York in 1900, the annual exhibition of the Architectural League of New York in 1905, and The Whitney Museum of American Art in 1984

She lived in Montclair, New York until her death on 11 November 1933 and was buried in Patchogue's Cedar Grove Cemetery.

References

External links 

 
 

American stained glass artists and manufacturers
American illustrators
Artists from New York City
1873 births
1933 deaths
American designers
Parsons School of Design alumni